Rahim Beširović (born 2 January 1971) is a Serbia and Montenegro former professional footballer who played as a striker.

Career
After starting out at his hometown club Novi Pazar, Beširović moved to Budućnost Podgorica in the summer of 1994, becoming their top scorer that season. He was subsequently transferred to Partizan in the summer of 1995. With 11 goals, Beširović helped the Belgrade club win the 1995–96 First League of FR Yugoslavia. He later played abroad for Spanish club Lleida (1996–1998) and South Korean club Pusan Daewoo Royals (1998–1999).

Honours
Partizan
 First League of FR Yugoslavia: 1995–96

External links
 
 
 

1971 births
Living people
Bosniaks of Serbia
Sportspeople from Novi Pazar
Serbia and Montenegro footballers
Association football forwards
First League of Serbia and Montenegro players
K League 1 players
Segunda División players
FK Novi Pazar players
FK Budućnost Podgorica players
FK Partizan players
UE Lleida players
Busan IPark players
Serbia and Montenegro expatriate footballers
Serbia and Montenegro expatriate sportspeople in Spain
Expatriate footballers in Spain
Serbia and Montenegro expatriate sportspeople in South Korea
Expatriate footballers in South Korea